Glasco is a city in Cloud County, Kansas, United States.  As of the 2020 census, the population of the city was 441.

History
Glasco was originally called Del Ray, and under the latter name was laid out and platted in 1870.  The name Glasco was adopted officially by the Kansas legislature in 1878 and incorporated as a city of the third class April 14, 1886, and named after Glasgow, Scotland.  Glasco was a shipping point on the Union Pacific railroad.

Historic sites
This small town has two items of interest on the National Register of Historic Places:  Pott's Ford Bridge is located just 1/2 mile south of the city limits, and the entire downtown business district has also earned a listing on the register.

Geography
Glasco is located at  (39.360724, -97.836974).

Climate
The climate in this area is characterized by hot, humid summers and generally mild to cool winters.  According to the Köppen Climate Classification system, Glasco has a humid subtropical climate, abbreviated "Cfa" on climate maps.

Demographics

2010 census
As of the census of 2010, there were 498 people, 218 households, and 143 families residing in the city. The racial makeup of the city was 98.4% White, 1.4% from other races, and 0.2% from two or more races. Hispanic or Latino of any race were 0.8% of the population.

There were 218 households, of which 22.0% had children under the age of 18 living with them, 50.0% were married couples living together, 10.1% had a female householder with no husband present, 5.5% had a male householder with no wife present, and 34.4% were non-families. 31.2% of all households were made up of individuals, and 14.7% had someone living alone who was 65 years of age or older. The average household size was 2.20 and the average family size was 2.70.

The median age in the city was 51.3 years. 19.7% of residents were under the age of 18; 5.1% were between the ages of 18 and 24; 17% were from 25 to 44; 28.6% were from 45 to 64; and 29.3% were 65 years of age or older. The gender makeup of the city was 48.2% male and 51.8% female.

2000 census
As of the census of 2000, there were 536 people, 238 households, and 143 families residing in the city. The racial makeup of the city was 98.32% White, 0.19% Native American, 0.19% Asian, and 1.31% from two or more races. Hispanic or Latino of any race were 0.19% of the population.

There were 238 households, out of which 15.5% had children under the age of 18 living with them, 52.9% were married couples living together, 5.9% had a female householder with no husband present, and 39.5% were non-families. 37.0% of all households were made up of individuals, and 21.4% had someone living alone who was 65 years of age or older. The average household size was 2.08 and the average family size was 2.67.

In the city, the population was spread out, with 16.4% under the age of 18, 4.5% from 18 to 24, 19.4% from 25 to 44, 24.3% from 45 to 64, and 35.4% who were 65 years of age or older. The median age was 54 years. For every 100 females, there were 88.1 males. For every 100 females age 18 and over, there were 89.8 males.

As of 2000 the median income for a household in the city was $26,250, and the median income for a family was $31,071. Males had a median income of $22,422 versus $20,625 for females. The per capita income for the city was $14,875. About 11.2% of families and 16.5% of the population were below the poverty line, including 27.3% of those under age 18 and 8.5% of those age 65 or over.

Education
The community is served by Southern Cloud USD 334 public school district.

Notable people
 Elmer Stricklett, baseball player.

References

Further reading

External links
 City of Glasco
 Glasco - Directory of Public Officials
 Glasco history
 Glasco city map, KDOT

Cities in Kansas
Cities in Cloud County, Kansas
Populated places established in 1871
1871 establishments in Kansas